Pacific Shores Center is a high-tech business park located in Redwood City, California, adjacent to the Port of Redwood City.

History
The property that Pacific Shores Center was developed on had many uses through the years from part of the Redwood City Harbor Company to cement production to being part of saltworks with Leslie Salt.
In 1990 the Teachers' Retirement System of the State of Illinois bought  of land adjacent to the Port of Redwood City and Westpoint Slough and formed the Pacific Shores Center Partnership to develop it.
In November 1999 Jay Paul Company entered into an agreement to buy the rights for the project by outbidding several other competing developers with a  bid.
By early 2000 with the buildings not even complete; Excite@Home, Phone.com, Informatica Corp, and BroadVision Inc. had all signed leases. Demand at the time caused rent prices to increase for the center as well.
At this time there were plans for a ferry service to connect San Francisco and Alameda, California to an adjacent ferry terminal to mitigate traffic concerns at the time with so many of the expected workers to be projected commuting.

By April 2002 the burst of the Dot-com bubble had decreased demand for office space and the center previously estimated to fill completely was sitting with a vacancy rate of 65%.
Tenants at the time included Eidos Interactive, PDL BioPharma, DreamWorks Animation, Threshold Pharmaceutical, Openwave, Symantec, and engineering firm Rudolph and Sletten.
The following year two of the buildings, specifically the ones PDL BioPharma was located within, were sold to Shorenstein Properties for an undisclosed sum, for the first time making Pacific Shores Center to have more than one owner.
San Mateo County filed a lawsuit in August 2009 over a tax dispute with the Center. County officials claimed that the sale of property in 2006 never had the property transfer taxes paid while the Center argued over the county tax code.

Starwood Capital ran into issues with overdue debt in 2012 and brought in Blackstone with an ownership stake.
This has left Pacific Shores Center with fragmented ownership to this day with the three owners all with different sections.

Other
Pacific Shores Center is used more than just as an area for work. The facilities present include a  fitness center that includes a gym, pool, and spa along with playing fields.
Public shore access allows for people to park and walk along the Westpoint Slough on a section of the San Francisco Bay Trail.

The annual Stanford University Treeathlon triathlon competition is hosted in part at the center along with the Westpoint Harbor.

Gallery

See also

Seaport Centre
Redwood Shores
Westpoint Harbor

References

External links

DES Architects Pacific Shores Center
Treeathalon Official Site

Redwood City, California
Business parks of the United States
Science and technology in the San Francisco Bay Area
Buildings and structures in San Mateo County, California
2001 establishments in California